Kendall Kramer is an American olympic cross-country skier.

Career
She attended West Valley High School. Kramer competed in the cross-country skiing  at the 2020 Winter Youth Olympics, being awarded the bronze medal in the girls' 5 kilometre classical event.

References

External links 

Living people
Place of birth missing (living people)
Year of birth missing (living people)
American female cross-country skiers
Cross-country skiers at the 2020 Winter Youth Olympics
Medalists at the 2020 Winter Youth Olympics
Medalists at the 2023 Winter World University Games
21st-century American women
Universiade medalists in cross-country skiing
Universiade silver medalists for the United States
Youth Olympic bronze medalists for the United States